Passum was a raisin wine (wine from semi-dried grapes) apparently developed in ancient Carthage (in now modern Tunisia) and transmitted from there to Italy, where it was popular in the Roman Empire. The earliest surviving instruction constitutes the only known Carthaginian recipe. It is a fragment from the Punic farming manual by Mago in its Latin translation by Decimus Junius Silanus (2nd century BC). It survives because it was summarised by Columella (1st century AD):

Mago
A recipe for passum was recorded in an agricultural manual by Mago, a Punic writer. The original Punic work is lost, but the recipe is quoted in a later latin work, De Agricultura by Columella.

Later, less detailed, instructions are found in other Latin and Greek sources.

Passum was produced extensively in the eastern Mediterranean through the Roman period, and its popularity is referred to by Pliny the Elder in his Natural History. Research indicates that it found popularity amongst women in the kitchen, due to easy accessibility, in the medicinal world and also within religious contexts - possibly in Judaism and the early Christian eucharist.

"Passum de Magon", is a modern Tunisian natural sweet wine from Kelibia in the Cap Bon region, the traditional agricultural hub of Carthage, that honors the memory of Mago and is made in this antique fashion.

See also
 Passito, the modern Italian wine made in this fashion. A notable passito comes from Pantelleria, an island in the Sicily Channel not far from the site of Carthage.
 Vin Santo, an Italian dessert wine made from dried grapes.

References

Ancient wine
Dessert wine
Carthage